"Heartbreak" is a song recorded by South Korean singer and rapper Minho released digitally on December 21, 2021 through SM Entertainment. The song was written by Park Tae-won, Parrish Warrington, Diederik Van Elsas, Joren Van Der Voort, and Alex Aiono, and produced by Trackside.

Release and promotion
Promotional materials for "Heartbreak", including image teasers and the music video teaser, were revealed via Shinee's social media accounts beginning December 13, 2021. Minho showcased the song for the first time at his Beyond Live fan meeting, Best Choi's Minho 2021, on the same day.

Charts

Release history

References

2021 songs
2021 singles
Korean-language songs
SM Entertainment singles